John Ronald Smight (March 9, 1925 – September 1, 2003) was an American theatre and film director. His film credits include  Harper (1966), No Way to Treat a Lady (1968), Airport 1975 (1974), Midway (1976), and Fast Break (1979).

Biography
Smight was born in Minneapolis, Minnesota and went to Cretin High School with future actor Peter Graves.

He joined the Army Air Forces, flying missions in the Pacific during World War II, before earning his degree at the University of Minnesota. He then sought work as an actor. He worked as a radio actor and had a bit part in a stage production of Anna Lucasta.

He became stage manager for TV's The Good Egg of the Week and then assistant director on The Colgate Comedy Hour and The Dennis Day Show. He said a big break was working on Visit to a Small Planet with Cyril Ritchard.

In 1959, he won an Emmy for his direction of the hour-long play Eddie, which starred Mickey Rooney. He directed the 1960 Broadway play The 49th Cousin. He directed episodes for The Twilight Zone and The Alfred Hitchcock Hour.

Smight's first feature film was I'd Rather Be Rich (1964), a remake of It Started with Eve (1941). Smight said "it was not a particularly good script but it opened up a whole new life for me."

Smight then signed a contract with Warners to make six films at one a year.  He produced and directed The Third Day (1965) and then directed the Paul Newman starring vehicle Harper (1966), a big hit. He followed that with the British action comedy, Kaleidescope with Warren Beatty.

In 1966 he signed a three-picture deal with the Mirisch Brothers and bought the rights to the novel The Illustrated Man. In 1968, he directed the cult classic comedic thriller No Way to Treat a Lady, starring Rod Steiger and George Segal. Other notable films directed by Smight include Airport 1975 (1974) and Midway (1976), back-to-back box office hits.

Smight's last film was a US-Swiss co-production, The Favorite (1989), also known as La Nuit du serail.

Smight died of cancer in Los Angeles in 2003.

Filmography

Film

Television
Television Series 

Television Films

Awards & Nominations

References

External links
 
 
 
 Obituary-Jack Smight The Guardian

Artists from Minneapolis
1925 births
2003 deaths
Deaths from cancer in California
Film directors from Minnesota
Film producers from Minnesota